Sir Frank Crisp,  1st Baronet, (25 October 1843 – 29 April 1919) was an English lawyer and microscopist. Crisp was an enthusiastic member, and sometime officer, of the Royal Microscopical Society. He was generous in his support of the Society, donating furniture, books and instruments in addition to his work on technical publications.

Biography
 

Frank Crisp was born on 25 October 1843 in London. Crisp's mother died when he was three years old and as a result he was brought up by his grandfather, John Filby Childs. He resolved to take up the law and at 16 was articled to a firm of solicitors. He also studied at the University of London, obtaining the degrees of BA in 1864 and LLB in 1865. In 1867 he married Catherine Howes. From 1881 to 1906, Crisp was the treasurer, and later a vice-president, of the Linnean Society; Catherine Crisp, along with fourteen of the fifteen other women whose names were presented on 17 November 1904, was elected a fellow of the Society, withdrawing in 1916.

Crisp qualified as a solicitor in 1869 and his reputation soon grew, acting in many important commercial contracts. He counted several foreign railroad companies and the Imperial Japanese Navy among his clients, and drew up the contract for the cutting of the Cullinan diamond.

Having been knighted on 16 December 1907, Crisp was created a baronet on 5 February 1913 for services as legal advisor to the Liberal Party.

In 1889, he bought Friar Park in Henley-on-Thames. He was a keen horticulturist and developed spectacular public gardens there, including an alpine garden featuring a 20-foot (6-metre) replica of the Matterhorn. He published an exhaustive survey of medieval gardening titled Mediaeval Gardens. He commissioned Henry Ernest Milner to design the gardens.

Crisp died on 29 April 1919 aged 75.

Legacy
Former Beatle George Harrison purchased Friar Park in January 1970. He wrote a tribute to Crisp called "Ballad of Sir Frankie Crisp (Let It Roll)", which appeared on the album All Things Must Pass and later provided part of the title for his 2009 career-spanning compilation Let It Roll: Songs by George Harrison. In addition, Harrison's 1974 hit single "Ding Dong, Ding Dong" contains the lyrical refrain "Ring out the old, ring in the new / Ring out the false, ring in the true", which was taken from one of a number of inscriptions Crisp had engraved in the house and grounds of the property. (It is actually from Ring Out, Wild Bells, a section of the Tennyson poem In Memoriam A. H. H.) The lyrics and title of another Harrison track, "The Answer's at the End", were also inspired by the writings of Frank Crisp: "Scan not a friend with a microscopic glass / You know his faults, now let his foibles pass / Life is one long enigma, my friend / So read on, read on, the answer's at the end."

References

Further reading
The Times, 1 May 1919; 5 May 1919;
Solicitors' Journal, 63 (1918–19), 484.
Buchan, U. (2000) "Frank's fame", The Spectator, 22 January

— (1984) "Sir Frank Crisp, baronet (1843–1919)", Microscopy, 35 (Jan–June), pp10–24
Sternberg, I. (2002) "Eccentric enthusiasts – stories from the far side of the garden", Plants and Gardens News, 17(3)
Cardinal.: Friar Park: A Pictorial History. Campfire Publishing, 2014
Cardinal.: Friar Park: 1919 Estate Auction Catalogue. Campfire Publishing, 2014
Cardinal.: Greetings from Friar Park (Henley-on-Thames): An archive of postcards celebrating the estate of The Beatles' George Harrison. Campfire Publishing, 2017
Cardinal.: Welcome to Friar Park: A Guide for Time-Travelers visiting the estate owned by The Beatles' George Harrison. Campfire Publishing, 2019
Cardinal.: Friar Park Henley-on-Thames Guide for the Use of Visitors: Special Color Edition of the 1914 Original. Campfire Publishing, 2020

1843 births
1919 deaths
Alumni of the University of London
Crisp, Frank, 1st Baronet
Microscopists
English solicitors
People educated at University College School
Stewards of Henley Royal Regatta
Fellows of the Linnean Society of London
Fellows of the Royal Microscopical Society